Michael Richardson (born September 2, 1985) is an American professional soccer player who plays as a midfielder.

Career
After attending UNC Greensboro, Richardson spent two seasons with the Charleston Battery, appearing in 50 matches, scoring one goal.

References

1985 births
Living people
American soccer players
Charleston Battery players
USL First Division players
Association football midfielders